Dashli-ye Olya (also Romanized as Dāshlī-ye ‘Olyā; also known as Dāshlī-ye Bālā) is a village in Soltanali Rural District, in the Central District of Gonbad-e Qabus County, Golestan Province, Iran. At the 2006 census, its population was 727, in 141 families.

References 

Populated places in Gonbad-e Kavus County